The On-the-Square Girl is a 1917 American silent drama film directed by George Fitzmaurice and starring Mollie King, L. Rogers Lytton, and Aimee Dalmores.

Cast
 Mollie King as Anne Blair 
 L. Rogers Lytton as Thomas Brockton 
 Aimee Dalmores as Inez Brockton 
 Donald Hall as Richard Steel 
 Ernest Lawford as Renee 
 Richard Tucker as Actor

References

Bibliography
 Paul C. Spehr. The Movies Begin: Making Movies in New Jersey, 1887-1920. Newark Museum, 1977.

External links
 

1917 films
1917 drama films
1910s English-language films
American silent feature films
Silent American drama films
American black-and-white films
Films directed by George Fitzmaurice
Pathé Exchange films
1910s American films